Anne Paulk is the executive director of Restored Hope Network, an interdenominational Christian ex-gay ministry headed up primarily of former members of Exodus International.

Paulk identifies as an ex-lesbian. She co-wrote a book with her ex-husband John Paulk called Love Won Out: How God's Love Helped 2 People Leave Homosexuality and Find Each Other.

References

Year of birth missing (living people)
Living people
Place of birth missing (living people)
People self-identified as ex-gay